A phonograph record (also known as a gramophone record, especially in British English), a vinyl record, or simply a record is an analog sound storage medium in the form of a flat disc with an inscribed, modulated spiral groove. The groove usually starts near the periphery and ends near the center of the disc. At first, the discs were commonly made from shellac, with earlier records having a fine abrasive filler mixed in. Starting in the 1940s polyvinyl chloride became common, hence the common use of the word "vinyl". 

The phonograph record was the primary medium used for music reproduction throughout the 20th century. It had co-existed with the phonograph cylinder from the late 1880s and had effectively superseded it by around 1912. Records retained the largest market share even when new formats such as the compact cassette were mass-marketed. By the 1980s, digital media, in the form of the compact disc, had gained a larger market share, and the record left the mainstream in 1991. Since the 1990s, records continue to be manufactured and sold on a smaller scale, and during the 1990s and early 2000s were commonly used by disc jockeys (DJs), especially in dance music genres. They were also listened to by a growing number of audiophiles. The phonograph record has made a niche resurgence as a format for rock music in the early 21st century—9.2 million records were sold in the US in 2014, a 260% increase since 2009. Likewise, sales in the UK increased five-fold from 2009 to 2014.

, 48 record pressing facilities exist worldwide, 18 in the US and 30 in other countries. The increased popularity of the record has led to the investment in new and modern record-pressing machines. Only two producers of lacquers (acetate discs or master discs) remain: Apollo Masters in California, and MDC in Japan. On February 6, 2020, a fire destroyed the Apollo Masters plant. According to the Apollo Masters website, their future is still uncertain.

Phonograph records are generally described by their diameter in inches (12-inch, 10-inch, 7-inch) (although they were designed in millimeters), the rotational speed in revolutions per minute (rpm) at which they are played (45, 78), and their time capacity, determined by their diameter and speed (LP [long playing], 12-inch disc,  rpm; SP [single], 10-inch disc, 78 rpm, or 7-inch disc, 45 rpm; EP [extended play], 12-inch disc or 7-inch disc,  or 45 rpm); their reproductive quality, or level of fidelity (high-fidelity, orthophonic, full-range, etc.); and the number of audio channels (mono, stereo, quad, etc.).

The phrase broken record refers to a malfunction when the needle skips/jumps back to the previous groove and plays the same section over and over again indefinitely.

History

Predecessors

The phonautograph was invented on 25 March 1857 by Frenchman Édouard-Léon Scott de Martinville, an editor and typographer of manuscripts at a scientific publishing house in Paris. One day while editing Professor Longet's Traité de Physiologie, he happened upon that customer’s engraved illustration of the anatomy of the human ear, and conceived of "the imprudent idea of photographing the word." In 1853 or 1854 (Scott cited both years) he began working on "" ("the problem of speech writing itself"), aiming to build a device that could replicate the function of the human ear. 

Scott coated a plate of glass with a thin layer of lampblack. He then took an acoustic trumpet, and at its tapered end affixed a thin membrane that served as the analog to the eardrum. At the center of that membrane, he attached a rigid boar's bristle approximately a centimeter long, placed so that it just grazed the lampblack. As the glass plate was slid horizontally in a well formed groove at a speed of one meter per second, a person would speak into the trumpet, causing the membrane to vibrate and the stylus to trace figures that were scratched into the lampblack. On 25 March 1857, Scott received the French patent #17,897/31,470 for his device, which he called a phonautograph. The earliest known surviving recorded sound of a human voice was conducted on 9 April 1860 when Scott recorded someone singing the song "Au Clair de la Lune" ("By the Light of the Moon") on the device. However, the device was not designed to play back sounds, as Scott intended for people to read back the tracings, which he called phonautograms. By late 1857, with support from the Société d'encouragement pour l'industrie nationale, Scott’s phonautograph was recording sounds with sufficient precision to be adopted by the scientific community, paving the way for the nascent science of acoustics. 

The device’s true significance in the history of recorded sound was not fully realized prior to March 2008, when it was discovered and resurrected in a Paris patent office by First Sounds, an informal collaborative of American audio historians, recording engineers, and sound archivists founded to make the earliest sound recordings available to the public. The phonautograms were then digitally converted by scientists at the Lawrence Berkeley National Laboratory in California, who were able to play back the recorded sounds, something Scott had never conceived of. Prior to this point, the earliest known record of a human voice was thought to be an 1877 phonograph recording by Thomas Edison. The phonautograph would play a role in the development of the gramophone, whose inventor, Emile Berliner, worked with the phonautograph in the course of developing his own device.

Edison invented the phonograph in 1877. Unlike the phonautograph, Edison's phonograph could both record and reproduce sound.  Edison first tried recording sound on a wax-impregnated paper tape, with the idea of creating a "telephone repeater" analogous to the telegraph repeater he had been working on. Although the visible results made him confident that sound could be physically recorded and reproduced, his notes do not indicate that he actually reproduced sound before his first experiment in which he used tinfoil as a recording medium several months later. The tinfoil was wrapped around a grooved metal cylinder and a sound-vibrated stylus indented the tinfoil while the cylinder was rotated. The recording could be played back immediately. The Scientific American article that introduced the tinfoil phonograph to the public mentioned Marey, Rosapelly and Barlow, as well as Scott as creators of devices for recording but, importantly, not reproducing sound. 

For years, Edison refused to acknowledge the steady rise in preference for disc records. By 1910, with sales plummeting, Edison finally realized that demand for cylinder records was waning and adopted the disc with the introduction of the Edison Disc Phonograph.

Emile Berliner improved the quality of recordings while his manufacturing associate Eldridge R. Johnson, who owned a machine shop in Camden, New Jersey, eventually improved the mechanism of the gramophone with a spring motor and a speed regulating governor, resulting in a sound quality equal to Edison's cylinders. Abandoning Berliner's "Gramophone" trademark for legal reasons in the United States, Johnson's and Berliner's separate companies reorganized in 1901 to form the Victor Talking Machine Company in Camden, New Jersey, whose products would come to dominate the market for several decades. 

Berliner's Montreal factory, which became the Canadian branch of RCA Victor, still exists. There is a dedicated museum in Montreal for Berliner (Musée des ondes Emile Berliner).

78 rpm disc developments

Early speeds
Early disc recordings were produced in a variety of speeds ranging from 60 to 130 rpm, and a variety of sizes. As early as 1894, Emile Berliner's United States Gramophone Company was selling single-sided 7-inch discs with an advertised standard speed of "about 70 rpm".

One standard audio recording handbook describes speed regulators, or governors, as being part of a wave of improvement introduced rapidly after 1897. A picture of a hand-cranked 1898 Berliner Gramophone shows a governor, and says that spring drives had replaced hand drives. It notes that:

The speed regulator was furnished with an indicator that showed the speed when the machine was running so that the records, on reproduction, could be revolved at exactly the same speed...The literature does not disclose why 78 rpm was chosen for the phonograph industry, apparently this just happened to be the speed created by one of the early machines and, for no other reason continued to be used.

In 1912, the Gramophone Company set 78 rpm as their recording standard, based on the average of recordings they had been releasing at the time, and started selling players whose governors had a nominal speed of 78 rpm. By 1925, 78 rpm was becoming standardized across the industry. However, the exact speed differed between places with alternating current electricity supply at 60 hertz (cycles per second, Hz) and those at 50 Hz. Where the mains supply was 60 Hz, the actual speed was 78.26 rpm: that of a 60 Hz stroboscope illuminating 92-bar calibration markings. Where it was 50 Hz, it was 77.92 rpm: that of a 50 Hz stroboscope illuminating 77-bar calibration markings.

Acoustic recording
Early recordings were made entirely acoustically, the sound being collected by a horn and piped to a diaphragm, which vibrated the cutting stylus. Sensitivity and frequency range were poor, and frequency response was very irregular, giving acoustic recordings an instantly recognizable tonal quality. A singer almost had to put his or her face in the recording horn. A way of reducing resonance was to wrap the recording horn with tape.

Even drums, if planned and placed properly, could be effectively recorded and heard on even the earliest jazz and military band recordings. The loudest instruments such as the drums and trumpets were positioned the farthest away from the collecting horn. Lillian Hardin Armstrong, a member of King Oliver's Creole Jazz Band, which recorded at Gennett Records in 1923, remembered that at first Oliver and his young second trumpet, Louis Armstrong, stood next to each other and Oliver's horn could not be heard. "They put Louis about fifteen feet over in the corner, looking all sad."

Electrical recording

During the first half of the 1920s, engineers at Western Electric, as well as independent inventors such as Orlando Marsh, developed technology for capturing sound with a microphone, amplifying it with vacuum tubes, then using the amplified signal to drive an electromechanical recording head. Western Electric's innovations resulted in a broader and smoother frequency response, which produced a dramatically fuller, clearer and more natural-sounding recording. Soft or distant sounds that were previously impossible to record could now be captured. Volume was now limited only by the groove spacing on the record and the amplification of the playback device. Victor and Columbia licensed the new electrical system from Western Electric and recorded the first electrical discs during the Spring of 1925. The first electrically recorded Victor Red Seal record was Chopin's "Impromptus" and Schubert's "Litanei" performed by pianist Alfred Cortot at Victor's studios in Camden, New Jersey.

A 1926 Wanamaker's ad in The New York Times offers records "by the latest Victor process of electrical recording". It was recognized as a breakthrough; in 1930, a Times music critic stated:
... the time has come for serious musical criticism to take account of performances of great music reproduced by means of the records. To claim that the records have succeeded in exact and complete reproduction of all details of symphonic or operatic performances ... would be extravagant ... [but] the article of today is so far in advance of the old machines as hardly to admit classification under the same name. Electrical recording and reproduction have combined to retain vitality and color in recitals by proxy.

The Orthophonic Victrola had an interior folded exponential horn, a sophisticated design informed by impedance-matching and transmission-line theory, and designed to provide a relatively flat frequency response. Victor's first public demonstration of the Orthophonic Victrola on October 6, 1925 at the Waldorf-Astoria Hotel was front-page news in The New York Times, which reported:
The audience broke into applause ... John Philip Sousa [said]: '[Gentlemen], that is a band. This is the first time I have ever heard music with any soul to it produced by a mechanical talking machine' ... The new instrument is a feat of mathematics and physics. It is not the result of innumerable experiments, but was worked out on paper in advance of being built in the laboratory ... The new machine has a range of from 100 to 5,000 [cycles per second], or five and a half octaves ... The 'phonograph tone' is eliminated by the new recording and reproducing process.

Sales of records plummeted precipitously during the early years of the Great Depression of the 1930s, and the entire record industry in America nearly foundered. In 1932, RCA Victor  introduced a basic, inexpensive turntable called the Duo Jr., which was designed to be connected to their radio receivers.  According to Edward Wallerstein (the general manager of the RCA Victor Division), this device was "instrumental in revitalizing the industry".

78 rpm materials
The production of shellac records continued throughout the 78 rpm era, which lasted until 1948 in industrialized nations.

During the Second World War, the United States Armed Forces produced thousands of 12-inch vinyl 78 rpm V-Discs for use by the troops overseas. After the war, the use of vinyl became more practical as new record players with lightweight crystal pickups and precision-ground styli made of sapphire or an exotic osmium alloy proliferated. In late 1945, RCA Victor began offering "De Luxe" transparent red vinyl pressings of some Red Seal classical 78s, at a de luxe price. Later, Decca Records introduced vinyl Deccalite 78s, while other record companies used vinyl formulations trademarked as Metrolite, Merco Plastic, and Sav-o-flex, but these were mainly used to produce "unbreakable" children's records and special thin vinyl DJ pressings for shipment to radio stations.

78 rpm recording time
The playing time of a phonograph record is directly proportional to the available groove length divided by the turntable speed. Total groove length in turn depends on how closely the grooves are spaced, in addition to the record diameter. At the beginning of the 20th century, the early discs played for two minutes, the same as cylinder records. The 12-inch disc, introduced by Victor in 1903, increased the playing time to three and a half minutes. Because the standard 10-inch 78 rpm record could hold about three minutes of sound per side, most popular recordings were limited to that duration. For example, when King Oliver's Creole Jazz Band, including Louis Armstrong on his first recordings, recorded 13 sides at Gennett Records in Richmond, Indiana, in 1923, one side was 2:09 and four sides were 2:52–2:59.

In January 1938, Milt Gabler started recording for Commodore Records, and to allow for longer continuous performances, he recorded some 12-inch discs. Eddie Condon explained: "Gabler realized that a jam session needs room for development." The first two 12-inch recordings did not take advantage of their capability: "Carnegie Drag" was 3m 15s; "Carnegie Jump", 2m 41s. But at the second session, on April 30, the two 12-inch recordings were longer: "Embraceable You" was 4m 05s; "Serenade to a Shylock", 4m 32s. Another way to overcome the time limitation was to issue a selection extending to both sides of a single record. Vaudeville stars Gallagher and Shean recorded "Mr. Gallagher and Mr. Shean", written by themselves or, allegedly, by Bryan Foy, as two sides of a 10-inch 78 in 1922 for Victor. Longer musical pieces were released as a set of records. In 1903 HMV in England made the first complete recording of an opera, Verdi's Ernani, on 40 single-sided discs. In 1940, Commodore released Eddie Condon and his Band's recording of "A Good Man Is Hard to Find" in four parts, issued on both sides of two 12-inch 78s. The limited duration of recordings persisted from their advent until the introduction of the LP record in 1948. In popular music, the time limit of  minutes on a 10-inch 78 rpm record meant that singers seldom recorded long pieces. One exception is Frank Sinatra's recording of Rodgers and Hammerstein's "Soliloquy", from Carousel, made on May 28, 1946. Because it ran 7m 57s, longer than both sides of a standard 78 rpm 10-inch record, it was released on Columbia's Masterwork label (the classical division) as two sides of a 12-inch record.

In the 78 era, classical-music and spoken-word items generally were released on the longer 12-inch 78s, about 4–5 minutes per side. For example, on June 10. 1924, four months after the 12 February premier of Rhapsody in Blue, George Gershwin recorded an abridged version of the seventeen-minute work with Paul Whiteman and His Orchestra. It was released on two sides of Victor 55225 and ran for 8m 59s.

Record albums
German record company Odeon pioneered the album in 1909 when it released the Nutcracker Suite by Tchaikovsky on four double-sided discs in a specially designed package.

78 rpm releases in the microgroove era
In 1968, Reprise planned to release a series of 78 rpm singles from their artists on their label at the time, called the Reprise Speed Series. Only one disc actually saw release, Randy Newman's "I Think It's Going to Rain Today", a track from his self-titled debut album (with "The Beehive State" on the flipside). Reprise did not proceed further with the series due to a lack of sales for the single, and a lack of general interest in the concept.

In 1978, guitarist and vocalist Leon Redbone released a promotional 78 rpm record featuring two songs ("Alabama Jubilee" and "Please Don't Talk About Me When I'm Gone") from his Champagne Charlie album.

In the 1990s Rhino Records issued a series of boxed sets of 78 rpm reissues of early rock and roll hits, intended for owners of vintage jukeboxes. The records were made of vinyl, however, and some of the earlier vintage 78 rpm jukeboxes and record players (the ones that were pre-war) were designed with heavy tone arms to play the hard slate-impregnated shellac records of their time. These vinyl Rhino 78's were softer and would be destroyed by old juke boxes and old record players, but play very well on newer 78-capable turntables with modern lightweight tone arms and jewel needles.

As a special release for Record Store Day 2011, Capitol re-released The Beach Boys single "Good Vibrations" in the form of a 10-inch 78 rpm record (b/w "Heroes and Villains"). More recently, The Reverend Peyton's Big Damn Band has released their tribute to blues guitarist Charley Patton Peyton on Patton on both 12-inch LP and 10-inch 78 rpm. Both are accompanied with a link to a digital download of the music, acknowledging the probability that purchasers might be unable to play the vinyl recording.

New sizes and materials

In 1931, RCA Victor launched the first commercially available vinyl long-playing record, marketed as program-transcription discs. These revolutionary discs were designed for playback at  rpm and pressed on a 30 cm diameter flexible plastic disc, with a duration of about ten minutes playing time per side. RCA Victor's early introduction of a long-play disc was a commercial failure for several reasons including the lack of affordable, consumer playback equipment and consumer rejection during the Great Depression.

Unwilling to accept and license Columbia's system, in February 1949, RCA Victor released the first 45 rpm single, 7 inches in diameter with a large center hole. The 45 rpm player included a changing mechanism that allowed multiple disks to be stacked, much as a conventional changer handled 78s. The short playing time of a single 45 rpm side meant that long works, such as symphonies, had to be released on multiple 45s instead of a single LP, but RCA Victor claimed that the new high-speed changer rendered side breaks so brief as to be inaudible or inconsequential. Early 45 rpm records were made from either vinyl or polystyrene. They had a playing time of eight minutes.

Speeds

Shellac era

At least one attempt to lengthen playing time was made in the early 1920s. World Records produced records that played at a constant linear velocity, controlled by Noel Pemberton Billing's patented add-on speed governor.

In the 1920s, 78.26 rpm was standardized when stroboscopic discs and turntable edge markings were introduced to standardize the speeds of recording lathes. At that speed, a strobe disc with 92 lines would "stand still" in 60 Hz light. In regions of the world that use 50 Hz current, the standard was 77.92 rpm (and a disk with 77 lines). 

The older 78 rpm format continued to be mass-produced alongside the newer formats using new materials in decreasing numbers until the summer of 1958 in the U.S., and in a few countries, such as the Philippines and India (both countries issued recordings by the Beatles on 78s), into the late 1960s. For example, Columbia Records' last reissue of Frank Sinatra songs on 78 rpm records was an album called Young at Heart, issued in November, 1954.

Microgroove and vinyl era
Columbia and RCA Victor each pursued their R&D secretly. 

The Seeburg Corporation introduced the Seeburg Background Music System in 1959, using a  rpm 9-inch record with 2-inch center hole. Each record held 40 minutes of music per side, recorded at 420 grooves per inch.

The commercial rivalry between RCA Victor and Columbia Records led to RCA Victor's introduction of what it had intended to be a competing vinyl format, the 7-inch (175 mm) 45 rpm disc, with a much larger center hole. For a two-year period from 1948 to 1950, record companies and consumers faced uncertainty over which of these formats would ultimately prevail in what was known as the "War of the Speeds" (see also Format war). In 1949 Capitol and Decca adopted the new LP format and RCA Victor gave in and issued its first LP in January 1950. The 45 rpm size was gaining in popularity, too, and Columbia issued its first 45s in February 1951. By 1954, 200 million 45s had been sold.

Eventually the 12-inch (300 mm)  rpm LP prevailed as the dominant format for musical albums, and 10-inch LPs were no longer issued. The last Columbia Records reissue of any Frank Sinatra songs on a 10-inch LP record was an album called Hall of Fame, CL 2600, issued on October 26, 1956, containing six songs, one each by Tony Bennett, Rosemary Clooney, Johnnie Ray, Frank Sinatra, Doris Day, and Frankie Laine. 

The 45 rpm discs also came in a variety known as extended play (EP), which achieved up to 10–15 minutes play at the expense of attenuating (and possibly compressing) the sound to reduce the width required by the groove. EP discs were cheaper to produce and were used in cases where unit sales were likely to be more limited or to reissue LP albums on the smaller format for those people who had only 45 rpm players. LP albums could be purchased one EP at a time, with four items per EP, or in a boxed set with three EPs or twelve items. The large center hole on 45s allows easier handling by jukebox mechanisms. EPs were generally discontinued by the late 1950s in the U.S. as three- and four-speed record players replaced the individual 45 players. One indication of the decline of the 45 rpm EP is that the last Columbia Records reissue of Frank Sinatra songs on 45 rpm EP records, called Frank Sinatra (Columbia B-2641) was issued on 7 December 1959. 

From the mid-1950s through the 1960s, in the U.S. the common home record player or "stereo" (after the introduction of stereo recording) would typically have had these features: a three- or four-speed player (78, 45, and sometimes  rpm); with changer, a tall spindle that would hold several records and automatically drop a new record on top of the previous one when it had finished playing, a combination cartridge with both 78 and microgroove styli and a way to flip between the two; and some kind of adapter for playing the 45s with their larger center hole. The adapter could be a small solid circle that fit onto the bottom of the spindle (meaning only one 45 could be played at a time) or a larger adapter that fit over the entire spindle, permitting a stack of 45s to be played.

RCA Victor 45s were also adapted to the smaller spindle of an LP player with a plastic snap-in insert known as a "spider". These inserts, commissioned by RCA president David Sarnoff and invented by Thomas Hutchison, were prevalent starting in the 1960s, selling in the tens of millions per year during the 45 rpm heyday. In countries outside the U.S., 45s often had the smaller album-sized holes, e.g., Australia and New Zealand, or as in the United Kingdom, especially before the 1970s, the disc had a small hole within a circular central section held only by three or four lands so that it could be easily punched out if desired (typically for use in jukeboxes).

Capacitance Electronic Discs were videodiscs invented by RCA, based on mechanically tracked ultra-microgrooves (9541 grooves/inch) on a 12-inch conductive vinyl disc. Only a small portion of the tracking stylus was electrically active; this sensing electrode detected the changing capacitance between it and microscopic peaks and valleys of the conductive disc surface, while the entire stylus rides over many crests at once.

High fidelity

The term "high fidelity" was coined in the 1920s by some manufacturers of radio receivers and phonographs to differentiate their better-sounding products claimed as providing "perfect" sound reproduction. The term began to be used by some audio engineers and consumers through the 1930s and 1940s. After 1949 a variety of improvements in recording and playback technologies, especially stereo recordings, which became widely available in 1958, gave a boost to the "hi-fi" classification of products, leading to sales of individual components for the home such as amplifiers, loudspeakers, phonographs, and tape players. High Fidelity and Audio were two magazines that hi-fi consumers and engineers could read for reviews of playback equipment and recordings.

Stereophonic sound
In this system, each of two stereo channels is carried independently by a separate groove wall, each wall face moving at 45 degrees to the plane of the record surface (hence the system's name) in correspondence with the signal level of that channel. By convention, the inner wall carries the left-hand channel and the outer wall carries the right-hand channel.  While the stylus only moves horizontally when reproducing a monophonic disk recording, on stereo records the stylus moves vertically as well as horizontally. During playback, the movement of a single stylus tracking the groove is sensed independently, e.g., by two coils, each mounted diagonally opposite the relevant groove wall.

In 1957 the first commercial stereo two-channel records were issued first by Audio Fidelity followed by a translucent blue vinyl on Bel Canto Records, the first of which was a multi-colored-vinyl sampler featuring A Stereo Tour of Los Angeles narrated by Jack Wagner on one side, and a collection of tracks from various Bel Canto albums on the back.

Noise reduction systems
A similar scheme aiming at the high-end audiophile market, and achieving a noise reduction of about 20 to 25 dB(A), was the Telefunken/Nakamichi High-Com II noise reduction system being adapted to vinyl in 1979. A decoder was commercially available but only one demo record is known to have been produced in this format.

Availability of encoded disks in any of these formats stopped in the mid-1980s.

The system deliberately reduced disk noise by 10 to 12 dB(A) only to remain virtually free of recognizable acoustical artifacts even when records were played back without an UC expander. In fact, the system was undocumentedly introduced into the market by several East-German record labels since 1983. Over 500 UC-encoded titles were produced without an expander becoming available to the public.

Formats

Types of records

Sizes of records in the United States and the UK are generally measured in inches, e.g. 7-inch records, which are generally 45 rpm records. LPs were 10-inch records at first, but soon the 12-inch size became by far the most common. Generally, 78s were 10-inch, but 12-inch and 7-inch and even smaller were made—the so-called "little wonders".

Standard formats

 Notes:
 Before the mid-1950s the  rpm LP was most commonly found in a 10-inch (25 cm) format. The 10-inch format disappeared from United States stores around 1957, supplanted by 12″ discs, but remained common in some markets until the mid-1960s. The 10-inch vinyl format was resurrected in the 1970s for marketing some popular recordings as collectible, and these are occasionally seen today.
 The first disk recordings were invented by Emile Berliner and were pressed as 7-inch, approximately 78 rpm recordings between 1887 and 1900. They are rarely found today.
 Columbia pressed many 7-inch  rpm vinyl singles in 1949, but were dropped in early 1950 due to the popularity of the RCA Victor 45.
 The EP Extended Play  rpm 7-inch disc, which typically contained two selections (tracks) on each side, was incompatible with existing jukeboxes and unsuccessful when introduced in the U.S. in the 1960s, but was common in Europe and other parts of the world.

Less common formats

Flexi discs were thin flexible records that were distributed with magazines and as promotional gifts from the 1960s to the 1980s.

In March 1949, as RCA Victor released the 45, Columbia released several hundred 7-inch,  rpm, small-spindle-hole singles. This format was soon dropped as it became clear that the RCA Victor 45 was the single of choice and the Columbia 12-inch LP would be the album of choice. 
The first release of the 45 came in seven colors: black 47-xxxx popular series, yellow 47-xxxx juvenile series, green (teal) 48-xxxx country series, deep red 49-xxxx classical series, bright red (cerise) 50-xxxx blues/spiritual series, light blue 51-xxxx international series, dark blue 52-xxxx light classics. Most colors were soon dropped in favor of black because of production problems. However, yellow and deep red were continued until about 1952.
The first 45 rpm record created for sale was "PeeWee the Piccolo" RCA Victor 47-0147 pressed in yellow translucent vinyl at the Sherman Avenue plant, Indianapolis on December 7, 1948, by R. O. Price, plant manager.

In the 1970s, the government of Bhutan produced now-collectible postage stamps on playable vinyl mini-discs.

Structure

Increasingly from the early 20th century, and almost exclusively since the 1920s, both sides of the record have been used to carry the grooves. Occasional records have been issued since then with a recording on only one side. In the 1980s Columbia records briefly issued a series of less expensive one-sided 45 rpm singles. 

Since its inception in 1948, vinyl record standards for the United States follow the guidelines of the Recording Industry Association of America (RIAA).

Vinyl quality
The sound quality and durability of vinyl records is highly dependent on the quality of the vinyl. During the early 1970s, as a cost-cutting move, much of the industry began reducing the thickness and quality of vinyl used in mass-market manufacturing. The technique was marketed by RCA Victor as the Dynaflex (125 g) process, but was considered inferior by most record collectors. Most vinyl records are pressed from a mix of 70% virgin and 30% recycled vinyl. Vinyl is a material that is sensitive for high temperatures as well as uneven temperatures on different parts of a record.

New or "virgin" heavy/heavyweight (180–220 g) vinyl is commonly used for modern audiophile vinyl releases in all genres. Many collectors prefer to have heavyweight vinyl albums, which have been reported to have better sound than normal vinyl because of their higher tolerance against deformation caused by normal play. 

180 gram vinyl is more expensive to produce only because it uses more vinyl. Manufacturing processes are identical regardless of weight. In fact, pressing lightweight records requires more care. An exception is the propensity of 200 g pressings to be slightly more prone to non-fill, when the vinyl biscuit does not sufficiently fill a deep groove during pressing (percussion or vocal amplitude changes are the usual locations of these artifacts). This flaw causes a grinding or scratching sound at the non-fill point.

Since most vinyl records contain up to 30% recycled vinyl, impurities can accumulate in the record and cause even a brand-new record to have audio artifacts such as clicks and pops. Virgin vinyl means that the album is not from recycled plastic, and will theoretically be devoid of these impurities.

The "orange peel" effect on vinyl records is caused by worn molds. Rather than having the proper mirror-like finish, the surface of the record will have a texture that looks like orange peel. This introduces noise into the record, particularly in the lower frequency range. With direct metal mastering (DMM), the master disc is cut on a copper-coated disc, which can also have a minor "orange peel" effect on the disc itself. As this "orange peel" originates in the master rather than being introduced in the pressing stage, there is no ill effect as there is no physical distortion of the groove.

Original master discs are created by lathe-cutting: a disc cutting lathe is used to cut a modulated groove into a blank record. The blank records for cutting used to be cooked up, as needed, by the cutting engineer, using what Robert K. Morrison describes as a "metallic soap", containing lead litharge, ozokerite, barium sulfate, montan wax, stearin and paraffin, among other ingredients. Cut "wax" sound discs would be placed in a vacuum chamber and gold-sputtered to make them electrically conductive for use as mandrels in an electroforming bath, where pressing stamper parts were made. Later, the French company Pyral invented a ready-made blank disc having a thin nitro-cellulose lacquer coating (approximately 7 mils thickness on both sides) that was applied to an aluminum substrate. Lacquer cuts result in an immediately playable, or processable, master record. If vinyl pressings are wanted, the still-unplayed sound disc is used as a mandrel for electroforming nickel records that are used for manufacturing pressing stampers. 

The electroformed nickel records are mechanically separated from their respective mandrels. This is done with relative ease because no actual "plating" of the mandrel occurs in the type of electrodeposition known as electroforming, unlike with electroplating, in which the adhesion of the new phase of metal is chemical and relatively permanent. The one-molecule-thick coating of silver (that was sprayed onto the processed lacquer sound disc in order to make its surface electrically conductive) reverse-plates onto the nickel record's face. This negative impression disc (having ridges in place of grooves) is known as a nickel master, "matrix" or "father". The "father" is then used as a mandrel to electroform a positive disc known as a "mother". Many mothers can be grown on a single "father" before ridges deteriorate beyond effective use. The "mothers" are then used as mandrels for electroforming more negative discs known as "sons". Each "mother" can be used to make many "sons" before deteriorating. The "sons" are then converted into "stampers" by center-punching a spindle hole (which was lost from the lacquer sound disc during initial electroforming of the "father"), and by custom-forming the target pressing profile. This allows them to be placed in the dies of the target (make and model) record press and, by center-roughing, to facilitate the adhesion of the label, which gets stuck onto the vinyl pressing without any glue. In this way, several million vinyl discs can be produced from a single lacquer sound disc. When only a few hundred discs are required, instead of electroforming a "son" (for each side), the "father" is removed of its silver and converted into a stamper. Production by this latter method, known as the "two-step process" (as it does not entail creation of "sons" but does involve creation of "mothers", which are used for test playing and kept as "safeties" for electroforming future "sons") is limited to a few hundred vinyl pressings. The pressing count can increase if the stamper holds out and the quality of the vinyl is high. The "sons" made during a "three-step" electroforming make better stampers since they do not require silver removal (which reduces some high fidelity because of etching erasing part of the smallest groove modulations) and also because they have a stronger metal structure than "fathers".

Limitations

Shellac 
One problem with shellac was that the size of the disks tended to be larger because it was limited to 80–100 groove walls per inch before the risk of groove collapse became too high, whereas vinyl could have up to 260 groove walls per inch.

Vinyl

Although vinyl records are strong and do not break easily, they scratch due to its soft material sometimes resulting in ruining the record. Vinyl readily acquires a static charge, attracting dust that is difficult to remove completely. Dust and scratches cause audio clicks and pops. In extreme cases, they can cause the needle to skip over a series of grooves, or worse yet, cause the needle to skip backwards, creating a "locked groove" that repeats over and over. This is the origin of the phrase "like a broken record" or "like a scratched record", which is often used to describe a person or thing that continually repeats itself. 

A further limitation of the gramophone record is that fidelity steadily declines as playback progresses; there is more vinyl per second available for fine reproduction of high frequencies at the large-diameter beginning of the groove than exist at the smaller diameters close to the end of the side. At the start of a groove on an LP there are 510 mm of vinyl per second traveling past the stylus while the ending of the groove gives 200–210 mm of vinyl per second—less than half the linear resolution. 

There is controversy about the relative quality of CD sound and LP sound when the latter is heard under the very best conditions (see Comparison of analog and digital recording). It is notable, however, that one technical advantage with vinyl compared to the optical CD is that if correctly handled and stored, the vinyl record will be playable for decades and possibly centuries, which is longer than some versions of the optical CD. For vinyl records to be playable for years to come, they need to be handled with care and stored properly. Guidelines for proper vinyl storage include not stacking records on top of each other, avoiding heat or direct sunlight and placing them in a temperature controlled area that will help prevent vinyl records from warping and scratching. Collectors store their records in a variety of boxes, cubes, shelves and racks.

Equalization

History of equalization
Further, even after officially agreeing to implement the RIAA equalization curve, many recording labels continued to use their own proprietary equalization even well into the 1970s. Columbia is one such prominent example in the US, as are Decca, Teldec and Deutsche Grammophon in Europe.

Sound fidelity
At the time of the introduction of the compact disc (CD) in 1982, the stereo LP pressed in vinyl continued to suffer from a variety of limitations:

The stereo image was not made up of fully discrete Left and Right channels; each channel's signal coming out of the cartridge contained a small amount of the signal from the other channel, with more crosstalk at higher frequencies. High-quality disc cutting equipment was capable of making a master disc with 30–40 dB of stereo separation at 1,000 Hz, but the playback cartridges had lesser performance of about 20 to 30 dB of separation at 1000 Hz, with separation decreasing as frequency increased, such that at 12 kHz the separation was about 10–15 dB. A common modern view is that stereo isolation must be higher than this to achieve a proper stereo soundstage. However, in the 1950s the BBC determined in a series of tests that only 20–25 dB is required for the impression of full stereo separation.

Thin, closely spaced spiral grooves that allow for increased playing time on a  rpm microgroove LP lead to a tinny pre-echo warning of upcoming loud sounds. The cutting stylus unavoidably transfers some of the subsequent groove wall's impulse signal into the previous groove wall. It is discernible by some listeners throughout certain recordings, but a quiet passage followed by a loud sound will allow anyone to hear a faint pre-echo of the loud sound occurring 1.8 seconds ahead of time. This problem can also appear as "post"-echo, with a tinny ghost of the sound arriving 1.8 seconds after its main impulse.

LP versus CD

Audiophiles have differed over the relative merits of the LP versus the CD since the digital disc was introduced. In large part, the claim for vinyl superiority is due to the necessity for digital recordings to presume upper and lower bounds, sampling the tones and soundwaves within those limits and using the resulting information to store and recall the audio. Effectively, the digital recording is an idealized representation of a physical soundwave, while an analog recording captures the physical vibrations across their full frequency. Because most modern vinyl records are made from playbacks of files recorded digitally, there is no out-of-bounds audio to transfer to the disc. Vinyl's drawbacks, however, include surface noise, less resolution due to a lower dynamic range, and greater sensitivity to handling. Modern anti-aliasing filters and oversampling systems used in digital recordings have eliminated perceived problems observed with very early CD players.

There is a theory that vinyl records can audibly represent higher frequencies than compact discs, though most of this is noise and not relevant to human hearing. According to Red Book specifications, the compact disc has a frequency response of 20 Hz up to 22,050 Hz, and most CD players measure flat within a fraction of a decibel from at least 0 Hz to 20 kHz at full output. Due to the distance required between grooves, it is not possible for an LP to reproduce as low frequencies as a CD.  Additionally, turntable rumble and acoustic feedback obscures the low-end limit of vinyl but the upper end can be, with some cartridges, reasonably flat within a few decibels to 30 kHz, with gentle roll-off. Carrier signals of Quad LPs popular in the 1970s were at 30 kHz to be out of the range of human hearing. The average human auditory system is sensitive to frequencies from 20 Hz to a maximum of around 20,000 Hz. The upper and lower frequency limits of human hearing vary per person. High frequency sensitivity decreases as a person ages, a process called presbycusis.

Preservation

As the playing of gramophone records causes gradual degradation of the recording, they are best preserved by transferring them onto other media and playing the records as rarely as possible. They need to be stored on edge, and do best under environmental conditions that most humans would find comfortable. 

Where old disc recordings are considered to be of artistic or historic interest, from before the era of tape or where no tape master exists, archivists play back the disc on suitable equipment and record the result, typically onto a digital format, which can be copied and manipulated to remove analog flaws without any further damage to the source recording. For example, Nimbus Records uses a specially built horn record player to transfer 78s. Anyone can do this using a standard record player with a suitable pickup, a phono-preamp (pre-amplifier) and a typical personal computer. However, for accurate transfer, professional archivists carefully choose the correct stylus shape and diameter, tracking weight, equalisation curve and other playback parameters and use high-quality analogue-to-digital converters.

As an alternative to playback with a stylus, a recording can be read optically, processed with software that calculates the velocity that the stylus would be moving in the mapped grooves and converted to a digital recording format. This does no further damage to the disc and generally produces a better sound than normal playback. This technique also has the potential to allow for reconstruction of broken or otherwise damaged discs.

Current status

Groove recordings, first designed in the final quarter of the 19th century, held a predominant position for nearly a century—withstanding competition from reel-to-reel tape, the 8-track cartridge, and the compact cassette. The widespread popularity of Sony's Walkman was a factor that contributed to the vinyl's lessening usage in the 1980s. In 1988, the compact disc surpassed the gramophone record in unit sales. Vinyl records experienced a sudden decline in popularity between 1988 and 1991, when the major label distributors restricted their return policies, which retailers had been relying on to maintain and swap out stocks of relatively unpopular titles. First the distributors began charging retailers more for new products if they returned unsold vinyl, and then they stopped providing any credit at all for returns. Retailers, fearing they would be stuck with anything they ordered, only ordered proven, popular titles that they knew would sell, and devoted more shelf space to CDs and cassettes. Record companies also removed many vinyl titles from production and distribution, further undermining the availability of the format and leading to the closure of pressing plants. This rapid decline in the availability of records accelerated the format's decline in popularity, and is seen by some as a deliberate ploy to make consumers switch to CDs, which unlike today, were more profitable for the record companies.

In spite of their flaws, such as the lack of portability, records still have enthusiastic supporters. Vinyl records continue to be manufactured and sold today, especially by independent rock bands and labels, although record sales are considered to be a niche market composed of audiophiles, collectors, and DJs. Old records and out-of-print recordings in particular are in much demand the world over.

In the United Kingdom, the popularity of indie rock caused sales of new vinyl records (particularly 7 inch singles) to increase significantly in 2006. 

In the United States, annual vinyl sales increased by 85.8% between 2006 and 2007, although starting from a low base, and by 89% between 2007 and 2008. However, sales increases have moderated over recent years falling to less than 10% during 2017.

Figures released in the United States in early 2009 showed that sales of vinyl albums nearly doubled in 2008, with 1.88 million sold—up from just under 1 million in 2007. In 2009, 3.5 million units sold in the United States, including 3.2 million albums, the highest number since 1998.

Sales have continued to rise into the 2010s, with around 2.8 million sold in 2010, which is the most sales since record keeping began in 1991, when vinyl had been overshadowed by Compact Cassettes and compact discs.

In 2021, Taylor Swift sold 102,000 copies of her ninth studio album Evermore on vinyl. The sales of the record beat the largest sales in one week on vinyl since Nielsen started tracking vinyl sales in 1991. The sales record was previously held by Jack White who sold 40,000 copies of his second solo release, Lazaretto, on vinyl in 2014. In 2014, the sale of vinyl records was the only physical music medium with increasing sales with relation to the previous year. Sales of other mediums including individual digital tracks, digital albums and compact discs have fallen, the last having the greatest drop-in-sales rate.

In 2011, the Entertainment Retailers Association in the United Kingdom found that consumers were willing to pay on average £16.30 (€19.37, US$25.81) for a single vinyl record, as opposed to £7.82 (€9.30, US$12.38) for a CD and £6.80 (€8.09, US$10.76) for a digital download. 

In 2015 the sales of vinyl records went up 32%, to $416 million, their highest level since 1988. There were 31.5 million vinyl records sold in 2015, and the number has increased annually ever since 2006. Vinyl sales continued to grow in 2017, comprising 14% of all physical album sales. The number one vinyl LP sold was the re-release of The Beatles' Sgt. Pepper's Lonely Hearts Club Band.

According to the RIAA's midyear report in 2020, phonograph record revenues surpassed those of CDs for the first time since the 1980s.

Less common recording formats

VinylVideo
VinylVideo is a format to store a low resolution black and white video on a vinyl record alongside encoded audio.

Capacitance Electronic Disc
Another example is the Capacitance Electronic Disc, a color video format, slightly better than VHS.

See also

 Capacitance Electronic Disc (CED)
 Conservation and restoration of vinyl discs
 LP album
 The New Face of Vinyl: Youth's Digital Devolution (photo documentary)
 Phonograph cylinder
 Record Store Day
 Sound recording and reproduction
 Unusual types of gramophone records

Notes

References

Further reading

 
 Lawrence, Harold; "Mercury Living Presence". Compact disc liner notes. Bartók, Antal Dorati, Mercury 432 017–2. 1991.
 International standard IEC 60098: Analogue audio disk records and reproducing equipment. Third edition, International Electrotechnical Commission, 1987.
 College Physics, Sears, Zemansky, Young, 1974, LOC #73-21135, chapter: "Acoustic Phenomena"
 Powell, James R., Jr. The Audiophile's Technical Guide to 78 rpm, Transcription, and Microgroove Recordings. 1992; Gramophone Adventures, Portage, MI. 
 Powell, James R., Jr. Broadcast Transcription Discs. 2001; Gramophone Adventures, Portage, MI. 
 Powell, James R., Jr. and Randall G. Stehle. Playback Equalizer Settings for 78 rpm Recordings. Third Edition. 1993, 2001, 2007; Gramophone Adventures, Portage, MI. 
 Scholes, Percy A. The Oxford Companion to Music. Ninth edition, Oxford University Press, 1955.
 From Tin Foil to Stereo: Evolution of the Phonograph by Oliver Read and Walter L. Welch
 The Fabulous Phonograph by Roland Gelatt, published by Cassell & Company, 1954 rev. 1977 
  Where Have All the Good Times Gone?: The Rise and Fall of the Record Industry Louis Barfe.
 Pressing the LP Record by Ellingham, Niel, published at 1 Bruach Lane, PH16 5DG, Scotland.
 Sound Recordings by Peter Copeland published 1991 by the British Library .
 Vinyl: A History of the Analogue Record by Richard Osborne. Ashgate, 2012. .
 "A Record Changer and Record of Complementary Design" by B. H. Carson, A. D. Burt, and H. I. Reiskind, RCA Review, June 1949
 "Recording Technology History: notes revised July 6, 2005, by Steven Schoenherr", San Diego University (archived 2010)

External links

 Playback equalization for 78 rpm shellacs and early LPs (EQ curves, index of record labels): Audacity Wiki
 The manufacturing and production of shellac records. Educational video, 1942.
 Reproduction of 78 rpm records including equalization data for different makes of 78s and LPs.
 The Secret Society of Lathe Trolls, a site devoted to all aspects of the making of Gramophone records.
 How to digitize gramophone records: Audacity Tutorial
 Actual list of vinyl pressing plants: vinyl-pressing-plants.com
 Dedicated museum for sound history: Musée des ondes Emile Berliner, Montreal, Canada

1894 in music
Articles containing video clips
Audio storage
Audiovisual introductions in 1894
Hip hop production
Recorded music
Turntablism